The Fame-class ships of the line were a class of four 74-gun third rates, designed for the Royal Navy by Sir John Henslow. After the name-ship of the class was ordered in October 1799, the design was slightly altered before the next three ships were ordered in February 1800. A second batch of five ships was ordered in 1805 to a slightly further modified version of the original draught.

Ships

First batch

Builder: Deptford Dockyard
Ordered: 15 October 1799
Laid down: 22 January 1802
Launched: 8 October 1805
Fate: Broken up, 1817

Builder: Perry, Blackwall Yard
Ordered: 4 February 1800
Laid down: June 1800
Launched: 17 June 1802
Fate: Broken up, 1836

Builder: Perry, Blackwall Yard
Ordered: 4 February 1800
Laid down: August 1800
Launched: 18 August 1803
Fate: Wrecked, 1811

Builder: Randall & Brent, Rotherhithe
Ordered: 4 February 1800
Laiddown: February 1801
Launched: 3 September 1803
Fate: Broken up, 1868

Second batch

Builder: Mrs Barnard, Deptford Wharf
Ordered: 31 January 1805
Laid down: August 1805
Launched: 22 June 1807
Fate: Broken up, 1835

Builder: Brent, Rotherhithe
Ordered: 31 January 1805
Laid down: August 1805
Launched: 7 July 1807
Fate: Broken up, 1854

Builder: Dudman, Deptford Wharf
Ordered: 31 January 1805
Laid down: December 1805
Launched: 19 September 1807
Fate: Broken up, 1864

Builder: Adams, Bucklers Hard
Ordered: 31 January 1805
Laid down: December 1805
Launched: May 1810
Fate: Broken up, 1833

Builder: Dudman, Deptford Wharf
Ordered: 31 January 1805
Laid down: June 1806
Launched: 4 March 1809
Fate: Broken up, 1850

References

Lavery, Brian (2003) The Ship of the Line – Volume 1: The development of the battlefleet 1650–1850. Conway Maritime Press. .
Winfield, Rif (2008) British Warships in the Age of Sail, 1793 – 1817. Seaforth Publishing. .

 
Ship of the line classes